The following is a list of novels and anthologies set in the Dungeons & Dragons campaign setting of Eberron.

The Dreaming Dark
 The City of Towers (Keith Baker, February 2005)
 The Shattered Land (Keith Baker, February 2006)
 The Gates of Night (Keith Baker, November 2006)

The Lost Mark
 Marked for Death (Matt Forbeck, March 2005)
 Road to Death (Matt Forbeck, January 2006)
 Queen of Death (Matt Forbeck, October 2006)

The War-Torn
 The Crimson Talisman (Adrian Cole, May 2005)
 The Orb of Xoriat (Edward Bolme, October 2005)
 In the Claws of the Tiger (James Wyatt, July 2006)
 Blood and Honor (Graeme Davis, September 2006)

The Dragon Below
 The Binding Stone (Don Bassingthwaite, August 2005)
 The Grieving Tree (Don Bassingthwaite, March 2006)
 The Killing Song (Don Bassingthwaite, December 2006)

Blade of the Flame
 Thieves of Blood (Tim Waggoner, May 2006)
 Forge of the Mindslayers (Tim Waggoner, March 2007)
 Sea of Death (Tim Waggoner, February 2008)

Heirs of Ash
 Voyage of the Mourning Dawn (Rich Wulf, June 2006)
 Flight of the Dying Sun (Rich Wulf, February 2007)
 Rise of the Seventh Moon (Rich Wulf, October 2007)

The Inquisitives
 Bound by Iron (Edward Bolme, April 2007)
 Night of the Long Shadows (Paul Crilley, May 2007)
 Legacy of Wolves (Marsheila Rockwell, June 2007)
 The Darkwood Mask  (Jeff LaSala, March 2008)

The Lanternlight Files
 The Left Hand of Death (Parker De Wolf, July 2007)
 When Night Falls (Parker De Wolf, October 2008)
 Death Comes Easy (Parker De Wolf, November 2010)

The Draconic Prophecies
 Storm Dragon (James Wyatt, Hardcover August 2007, Paperback May 2008)
 Dragon Forge (James Wyatt, Hardcover, June 2008, ; Paperback, April 2009)
 Dragon War (James Wyatt, Hardcover, August 2009, ; Paperback, March 2010)

The Legacy of Dhakaan
 The Doom of Kings (Don Bassingthwaite, August 2008)
 Word of Traitors (Don Bassingthwaite, September 2009)
 The Tyranny of Ghosts (Don Bassingthwaite, June 2010)

Thorn of Breland
 The Queen of Stone (Keith Baker, November 2008)
 Son of Khyber (Keith Baker, November 2009)
 The Fading Dream (Keith Baker, October 2010)

The Abraxis Wren Chronicles
 Night of the Long Shadows (Paul Crilley, May 2007)
 Taint of the Black Brigade (Paul Crilley, August 2010)

The Shard Axe
 The Shard Axe (Marsheila Rockwell, September 2011) (Released as Dungeons & Dragons Online: Eberron Unlimited)
 Skein of Shadows (Marsheila Rockwell, July 2012)

Other formats

Standalone novels 
Lady Ruin (Tim Waggoner, December 2010)

Anthologies
 Tales of the Last War (edited by Mark Sehestedt, April 2006)
 Dragons: Worlds Afire (R.A. Salvatore, Margaret Weis & Tracy Hickman, Keith Baker, and Scott McGough, Hardcover: June 2006, ; Oversized Paperback: July 2008). Anthology containing one story each from the Eberron, Forgotten Realms, Dragonlance, and Magic: The Gathering settings.
 Untold Adventures (edited by Alan Dean Foster, Kevin J. Anderson, and Mike Resnick, July 2011). Anthology containing stories from the Eberron, Forgotten Realms, Dark Sun, and Core settings.

Comics 

 Eberron: Eye of the Wolf (Devil's Due Publishing, Writer: Keith Baker, Artist: Chris Lie and Rob Ruffolo, June 2006)
 Infestation 2: Dungeons & Dragons (IDW Publishing, Writer: Paul Crilley, Artist: Valerio Schiti, Livio Ramondelli and menton3, February 2012)
 Dungeons & Dragons: Eberron—Annual 2012 (IDW Publishing, Writer: Paul Crilley, Artist: Paco Diaz and menton3, April 2012)

These comics were then published together as a collected edition trade paperback:
 Dungeons & Dragons: Abraxis Wren of Eberron (IDW Publishing, June 2015)

 
Lists of fantasy books